Leptobrachium chapaense is a species of amphibian in the family Megophryidae. It is found in China, Laos, Thailand, Vietnam, and possibly Myanmar. Its natural habitats are subtropical or tropical moist lowland forests, subtropical or tropical moist montane forests, and rivers. It is threatened by habitat loss.

References

chapaense
Taxonomy articles created by Polbot
Amphibians described in 1937